The Minister of Commerce and Industry of Sweden, officially Cabinet Minister and Head of the Ministry of Commerce and Industry, was a member of the Government of Sweden and was the head of the Ministry of Commerce and Industry from 1920 to 1982. The trade policy issues have been handled by a minister without portfolio since 1983 under different titles: Minister of Foreign Trade (1983–1996, 2019–present), Minister of Commerce and Industry (1996–2002, 2006–2014, 2016–2019) and Minister for Enterprise (2002–2006, 2014–2016).

History
Between 1 July 1920 to 31 December 1982, there was a separate Ministry of Commerce and Industry which was headed by the Minister of Commerce and Industry. Gunnar Lange (s) held the office for the longest time; 14 years and 32 days. The trade policy issues were dealt with between 1983 and 1996 by the Minister of Foreign Trade (Utrikeshandelsminister), who was a minister without portfolio at the Ministry for Foreign Affairs. From 1996 to 2002 the title was again Minister of Commerce and Industry, and from 2002 the issues were dealt with by the Minister for Enterprise. In 2006, trade issues were moved from the Ministry of Enterprise and Innovation back to the Ministry for Foreign Affairs by the Reinfeldt Cabinet. In 2014, the post of Minister of Commerce and Industry was abolished and trade matters were transferred to the Ministry of Enterprise and Innovation by the Löfven I Cabinet. In connection with the government reshuffle on 25 May 2016, the post was re-established and is sorted under the Ministry for Foreign Affairs. The post has been combined with other ministerial posts since 2016: Minister for EU Affairs (2016–2019), Minister for Nordic Cooperation (2019–2022) and Minister for International Development Cooperation (2022–present).

List of officeholders

Status'''

Ministers responsible for trade

Footnotes

References

Notes

Print

 
Lists of political office-holders in Sweden
1920 establishments in Sweden